Patrice Bergeron-Cleary (born July 24, 1985) is a Canadian professional ice hockey centre and captain of the Boston Bruins of the National Hockey League (NHL). Bergeron played junior hockey with the Acadie–Bathurst Titan of the Quebec Major Junior Hockey League (QMJHL) for one full season before being selected 45th overall by the Bruins in the 2003 NHL Entry Draft. He made the immediate jump from junior to the NHL after his draft and joined the Bruins in the 2003-04 season. Internationally, Bergeron competes for Canada and has won gold medals at the 2004 World Championships, 2005 World Junior Championships, 2010 Winter Olympics, 2012 Spengler Cup and 2014 Winter Olympics. Bergeron is a member of the Triple Gold Club after winning the Stanley Cup with Boston in 2011. He scored two goals, including the Stanley Cup-winning goal, in Game 7 against the Vancouver Canucks.

Known for his two-way abilities, Bergeron has earned five wins of the Frank J. Selke Trophy awarded annually to the NHL forward with the best defensive skills, the most wins of the trophy in NHL history, while also being nominated a record 11 times. He is regarded as one of the premier two-way forwards in the history of the NHL.

Playing career

Minor hockey
Bergeron grew up in his hometown of L'Ancienne-Lorette, Quebec, and was a Quebec Nordiques fan in his youth. Bergeron was mostly an A and AA player throughout his minor hockey days. He played in the 1998 and 1999 Quebec International Pee-Wee Hockey Tournaments with a minor ice hockey team from Sainte-Foy, Quebec City. He was drafted in the fifth round of the 2001 QMJHL Draft out of AAA Bantam hockey with the Sainte-Foy Gouverneurs. The following year, he played A hockey for the Séminaire St-François Blizzard before reporting to the Acadie-Bathurst Titan of the Quebec Major Junior Hockey League.

Boston Bruins (2003–present)
Bergeron was drafted 45th overall in the 2003 NHL Entry Draft by the Boston Bruins. During his rookie season, he was selected for the NHL YoungStars Game in Minnesota as part of the 2004 All-Star weekend. He finished his rookie season with 39 points in 71 games. His first NHL goal came versus the Los Angeles Kings on October 18, 2003, in a 4–3 Boston road victory. He would then score the overtime-winning goal in Game 2 of the Eastern Conference Quarter-Finals against the rival Montreal Canadiens on April 9, 2004.

Due to the 2004–05 NHL lockout, Bergeron played for Boston's minor league affiliate, the Providence Bruins of the American Hockey League (AHL), tallying 61 points in 68 games.

As the NHL resumed the following season, Bergeron led the Bruins with a career-high 31 goals and 73 points. He played the majority of the season with linemates Brad Boyes and newcomer Marco Sturm, who had been acquired in a trade that sent captain Joe Thornton to the San Jose Sharks in November 2005. Then Bruins general manager Mike O'Connell recalled in a June 2011 interview that the organization had decided to build the team around Bergeron instead of Thornton, preferring the former's on- and off-ice character. At the end of the year, Bergeron was selected by the Bruins to receive the team's 7th Player Award as the player most deemed to have exceeded expectations. Playing under a defensive system employed by new head coach Dave Lewis, he recorded his second consecutive 70-point campaign in 2006–07 with 22 goals and 48 assists. He again played alongside Sturm and Boyes until the latter was traded late in the season. Bergeron was hampered the majority of the season by a nagging shoulder injury.

After recording three goals and four assists in the first ten games of the 2007–08 season, Bergeron suffered a season-ending head injury during a game on October 27, 2007. Checked from behind by Philadelphia Flyers defenceman Randy Jones, Bergeron hit his head on the end-boards, knocking him unconscious. He lay motionless on the ice for several minutes before being wheeled off on a stretcher and taken to Massachusetts General Hospital, where he was diagnosed with a broken nose and a grade-three concussion. Jones received a two-game suspension from the NHL. Bergeron made his first public statements regarding the injury on November 8, saying he would not take any legal action and that Jones had tried to contact him to apologize.

On January 19, 2008, the Boston Globe reported Bergeron had been sent on a vacation by then Bruins general manager Peter Chiarelli and that he would likely sit out for the remainder of the season as his recovery had regressed. In March 2008, Bergeron started preliminary on-ice practice with Bruins goaltender Manny Fernandez, who was himself recovering from knee surgery. He steadily progressed into full-contact practices in early-April, aiming for a playoff return against the Montreal Canadiens in the opening round, however he was held back by team doctors. In June 2008, Bergeron was reported as being symptom-free during off-season training. He participated in the Bruins' summer development camp (typically for Bruins prospects) with Fernandez, before joining the Bruins' main training camp. He returned to action with the Bruins for the team's preseason opening game on September 22, 2008, against the Montreal Canadiens, an 8–3 victory played in Halifax, Nova Scotia.

After the 2008–09 season began, Bergeron scored his first goal since his concussion on October 23, 2008 in a 4–2 home loss to the Toronto Maple Leafs. Two months later, in a game against the Carolina Hurricanes on December 20, 2008, Bergeron collided with opposing defenceman (and future Bruin) Dennis Seidenberg, suffering another concussion. He lay face down on the ice while being attended to by team trainers and eventually left the ice under his own power. He was released from the hospital the day after the collision and placed on injured reserve. (Seidenberg and Bergeron later became teammates on the Bruins after a trade for Byron Bitz to the Florida Panthers in 2010 to acquire Seidenberg.) Bergeron returned after being sidelined for one month and completed the season with 39 points in 64 games. In the 2009 Stanley Cup playoffs, Bergeron recorded his first career fighting major in an altercation with Montreal's Josh Gorges.

2010s

In 2009–10, Bergeron scored 52 points while playing on a line with winger Mark Recchi. During the 2010 playoffs, he scored 4 goals and added 7 assists for 11 points in 14 games. The following season, Bergeron scored his first career NHL hat-trick in a Bruins victory over the Ottawa Senators on January 11, 2011. Bergeron was named the NHL's First Star of the Month and was twice named First Star of the Week in January 2011. Bergeron has been in two postseason fights in his entire NHL career, on April 18, 2009, in Game 2 of the Eastern Conference Quarter-Finals. Josh Gorges reached out and hit Bergeron in the jaw, and Bergeron retaliated by punching Gorges twice. This was seen as a huge motivator for the series. The second came on June 1, 2013, in Game 1 of the Eastern Conference Finals against the Pittsburgh Penguins. He and Evgeni Malkin began squaring off at centre ice, leading to Malkin knocking off Bergeron's helmet before they both threw off their gloves to fight. The two continued to throw blows even while referees attempted to separate them.

Bergeron was once again concussed after a hit from Claude Giroux on May 6, 2011 in Game 4 of the second round in the 2011 playoffs against Philadelphia. It is believed to be a mild concussion that kept him out of the beginning of the third round of the playoffs. On June 1, 2011, with the Boston Bruins, the Vancouver Canucks' Alexandre Burrows allegedly bit Bergeron's finger. No penalty was called and the NHL did not fine or suspend Burrows because the alleged bite was not supported by any evidence except a video of Burrows biting Bergeron's glove while his hand was still inside it and bite marks on Bergeron's finger.

Bergeron became the 26th member of the Triple Gold Club on June 15, 2011, with the Bruins when they won the team's sixth Stanley Cup. He scored two goals in Game 7 of the championship series against the Vancouver Canucks, including the game (and series) winner. On the Stanley Cup, Bergeron is listed by his birth name, Patrice Bergeron-Cleary. After the close of the 2012 NHL playoffs, even with the Bruins team eliminated in the first round by the Washington Capitals, Bergeron's constant defensive efforts on the ice earned him the Frank J. Selke Trophy as the NHL's top defensive forward for the 2011–12 season.

After finishing second in Selke Trophy voting for the lockout-shortened 2012–13 season, Bergeron turned in a heroic playoff performance which included the tying- and game-winning goals against the Toronto Maple Leafs in Game 7 of Round 1, and the overtime winner in Game 3 of the Eastern Conference Finals against the Pittsburgh Penguins. Bergeron also became renowned in the hockey world for displaying his toughness when, in the Stanley Cup Finals, he played through a punctured lung, separated shoulder, a broken rib and a broken nose.

The Bruins re-signed Bergeron to an eight-year, $52 million ($6.5 million per year) contract extension on July 12, 2013. In the following 2013–14 season, Bergeron reached the 30-goal mark for the second time in his career, achieving a total of 30 goals and 32 assists, and was a major factor as the Bruins won the Presidents' Trophy. For his performance in the regular season, Bergeron was awarded his second career Frank J. Selke Trophy, as well as the NHL Foundation Player Award. He was named as the cover athlete for the NHL 15 video game in the same ceremony.

As Bergeron continued to play with the Bruins for the 2014–15 season, on February 23, 2015, he scored his 200th career goal as the Bruins defeated the Chicago Blackhawks, 6–2. Bergeron, who has played his entire NHL career as a member of the Bruins since they drafted him in 2003, became the 17th player in franchise history to score 200 or more career goals for the club.

Bergeron's play during the 2016–17 season was hampered by a sports hernia that occurred at some time early in the season, but which was only revealed on April 25, 2017. Bergeron's sports hernia was operated on May 8, 2017, and he was expected to be ready for the Bruins' training camp before the 2017–18 season began. Near the halfway point of the 2017–18 season, on January 6, 2018, in a 7–1 home win for the Bruins over the Carolina Hurricanes, Bergeron scored four goals, including Bergeron's first-ever natural hat trick in his NHL professional career, bringing his scoring-point total (goals/assists combined) to 702 in his NHL playing career. Five games later, on January 18, Bergeron recorded the third hat-trick of his career (and second of the season) in a 5–2 win over the New York Islanders. After blocking an opposition shot with his right foot on February 24 against the hosting Toronto Maple Leafs, Bergeron discovered two days later he had broken a bone in his foot and would remain out of action for two weeks pending further evaluation of his foot fracture. By March 19, Bergeron had been able to start practicing his skating with the team. Bergeron was cleared to play in the Bruins road game against the Minnesota Wild on March 25, recording assists on each of the goals scored in the Bruins' 2–1 overtime win.

The 2018–19 season for the Bruins saw Bergeron achieve two impressive milestones in his NHL career: on February 5, 2019, Bergeron played in his 1,000th NHL game, all with the Bruins, scoring two goals in a 3-1 home ice win against the visiting New York Islanders By the late-season games of the 2018–19 season, Bergeron was set to break the 800-point milestone in his NHL career, which was achieved on March 16, 2019, with a goal that tied the game in the first period, leading to a 2–1 home-ice overtime Bruins win over the visiting Columbus Blue Jackets. On April 17, 2019, Bergeron was nominated for the Selke Trophy for an NHL-record eighth straight season.

2020s
On January 7, 2021, Bergeron was named the captain of the Boston Bruins. Zdeno Chára, who had been the team's captain since 2006, signed with the Washington Capitals two weeks earlier.

At the end of the 2020–21 regular season, Bergeron ranked fourth on the Boston Bruins all-time scoring list with 917 total points (375 goals and 542 assists).  At the time, he trailed only Ray Bourque, Johnny Bucyk and Phil Esposito. Just days before the June 9 elimination of the Bruins from the 2021 playoffs by the New York Islanders, Bergeron was nominated as a candidate for the Selke Trophy for the tenth straight season - however, Bergeron would instead win the Mark Messier Leadership Award for the 2020–21 season; for strong team leadership, and contributions to the general society.

It was not until the eighth game of the 2021–22 regular season that Bergeron would register his first Bruins goal of the season. On November 4, in a home game against the visiting Detroit Red Wings, Patrice scored only his second natural hat trick - and seventh hat trick overall - of his NHL career, as the foundation for a four-goal game by the Bruins team captain in a 5–1 defeat of the Red Wings. The Bruins were eliminated in the first round of the 2022 Stanley Cup playoffs by the Carolina Hurricanes. With the season marking the end of Bergeron's contract, and in light of his age and history of injuries, there was considerable uncertainty as to whether he would continue with the team. He ruled out playing for any other team, saying he would either re-sign or retire. 

On April 28, 2022, Bergeron scored a hat trick for his 400th career goal. He became the fourth player ever to score 400 goals for one team, joining Johnny Bucyk (545), Phil Esposito (459), and Rick Middleton (402). Bergeron was once again nominated for the Selke Trophy, and it was announced on June 5, 2022, that he had won the award for the record-setting fifth time.

On August 8, 2022, Bergeron signed a one-year contract to return to the Bruins for his nineteenth season. Bergeron scored his 1,000th point in his NHL career on November 21, 2022, in a 5–3 win over the Tampa Bay Lightning.

International play
 

Following his rookie season in the NHL, Bergeron was selected to play for Canada at the 2004 World Championships in Prague. He scored one goal in his international debut and won his first gold medal with Canada.

The following year, Bergeron was chosen to the Canadian national junior team for the 2005 World Junior Championships in North Dakota. He was lent to the team from the Providence Bruins of the AHL, where he was playing due to the NHL lockout. Bergeron was eligible for the World Juniors the previous year as well but was not lent to the national team because he was playing in the NHL. He finished the tournament with 5 goals and 8 assists totalling 13 points over 6 games while playing on a line with Sidney Crosby and Corey Perry. He scored a goal in Canada's 6–1 gold medal victory over Russia. He finished the tournament as the leading scorer to earn MVP and All-Star team honours. By helping Canada win gold at the tournament, he became the first player to win a men's gold medal before winning at the junior level.

Bergeron made his second appearance at the World Championships in 2006 and was reunited on a line with World Junior teammate Sidney Crosby, to whom he finished second in tournament scoring with 14 points. Bergeron was once again invited to play for Canada in the 2007 World Championships. He declined, citing he wanted to recover from injuries suffered during the NHL season.

On December 30, 2009, Bergeron was selected to play for Canada for the 2010 Winter Olympics in Vancouver; he was the only player selected who did not receive an invitation to the selection camp earlier in the summer. Many commentators predicted Bergeron would play on a line with Crosby due to his previous experience with him at the World Juniors and World Championships, but he ended up as the 13th forward due to a groin injury incurred in Canada's first game. He played primarily on the penalty kill and in defensive-zone faceoffs.

During the 2012–13 NHL lockout, Bergeron played for Lugano and competed for Canada at the 2012 Spengler Cup, along with teammate at the time, Tyler Seguin. Canada took gold in the event, and Bergeron scored the first goal in the first minute of a 7–2 Canada rout over Davos, and added three assists.

Bergeron won his second gold medal with Canada at the 2014 Winter Olympics and was a member of Canada's championship team at the 2016 World Cup of Hockey, reunited on both occasions on a line with Sidney Crosby.

Personal life
Bergeron is of both French-Canadian and Irish descent, by way of his father, Gerard Cleary. Although his legal surname is Bergeron-Cleary, it was truncated to Bergeron for simplicity.

Bergeron and his wife Stephanie Bertrand have three children together: Zach, Victoria, and Noah.

Career statistics

Regular season and playoffs

International

Awards, honours and records

Member of the Triple Gold Club
Scored the Stanley Cup-winning goal, 2011
Voted the cover athlete for EA Sports' NHL 15 video game
NHL All-Decade Second Team 2010–2019

Records
 First and only player in history to win the IIHF World Championship before the IIHF World U20 Championship
 Most Frank J. Selke Trophy wins in NHL history (5)
 Nominated for the Frank J. Selke Trophy for an NHL-record 11 straight seasons
 Frank J. Selke Trophy finalist for 11 consecutive seasons, the longest streak ever for a voted NHL Award in NHL history.
 Most playoff overtime goals in Boston Bruins history

See also
 List of NHL players with 1,000 points
 List of NHL players with 1,000 games played

References

External links
 

1985 births
Acadie–Bathurst Titan players
Boston Bruins draft picks
Boston Bruins players
Canadian expatriate ice hockey players in Switzerland
Canadian expatriate ice hockey players in the United States
Canadian ice hockey centres
Canadian people of French descent
Canadian people of Irish descent
Frank Selke Trophy winners
French Quebecers
HC Lugano players
Ice hockey people from Boston
Ice hockey people from Quebec
Ice hockey players at the 2010 Winter Olympics
Ice hockey players at the 2014 Winter Olympics
King Clancy Memorial Trophy winners
Living people
Medalists at the 2010 Winter Olympics
Medalists at the 2014 Winter Olympics
National Hockey League All-Stars
Olympic gold medalists for Canada
Olympic ice hockey players of Canada
Olympic medalists in ice hockey
People from Capitale-Nationale
Providence Bruins players
Sportspeople from Boston
Stanley Cup champions
Triple Gold Club